Pyrausta alexandra is a moth in the family Crambidae. It was described by Ayuna A. Shodotova in 2010. It is found in Transcaucasia.

References

Moths described in 2010
alexandra
Moths of Asia